The National Film Award for Best Animated Film is one of the National Film Awards presented annually by the Directorate of Film Festivals, the organisation set up by Ministry of Information and Broadcasting, India. It is one of several awards presented for feature films and awarded with a Golden Lotus (Swarna Kamal).

The award was instituted in 2006, at 54th National Film Awards and awarded annually for films produced in the year across the country, in all Indian languages; Hindi (3 awards), Tamil and Telugu (1 each).

Winners

References

External links 

 Official Page for Directorate of Film Festivals, India
 National Film Awards Archives
 National Film Awards at IMDb

Animated Film
Awards for best animated feature film

2006 establishments in India
Awards established in 2006